Kill from the Heart is an album by the hardcore punk band The Dicks. Widely considered a classic of the genre, it was the band's first full-length album and the last to feature the group's original Texas-based line-up. The album finds the band mixing its hardcore punk style with blues aesthetics.

Tim Kerr of the Big Boys appears on the song "Anti-Klan (Part Two)".  "Anti-Klan (Parts One and Two)", "Rich Daddy", "No Nazi's Friend", and "Kill From The Heart" appear on the 1980-1986 CD compilation.  The album was reissued on CD & LP by Alternative Tentacles in 2012.

Track listing 
 Anti-Klan (Part One)
 Rich Daddy
 No Nazi's Friend
 Marilyn Buck
 Kill From the Heart
 Little Boys' Feet
 Pigs Run Wild
 Bourgeois Fascist Pig
 Purple Haze
 Anti-Klan (Part Two)
 Right Wing/White Ring
 Dicks Can't Swim:
I. Cock Jam
II. Razor Blade Dance

2012 Reissue 
13. Dicks Hate the Police
14. Lifetime Problems
15. All Night Fever

All songs written by The Dicks except "Purple Haze", written by Jimi Hendrix.

Personnel 
 Gary Floyd - Vocals
 Glen Taylor - Guitar, Bass on "No Nazi's Friend" and "Marilyn Buck"
 Buxf Parrot - Bass/Backing Vocals, Guitar on "No Nazi's Friend" and "Marilyn Buck"
 Pat Deason - Drums/Backing Vocals
 Carlos Lowery - Artwork & Design
 Spot - Engineer and Producer
 Tim Kerr - Dobro on "Anti-Klan (Part Two)"
 Backing Vocals on "Anti-Klan (Part Two)" - The Torn Panties (Roxann Flowers, Dolores Aguirre, & Byrd Willey), Phillip Gilbeau, Spot, & Tim Kerr

References 

Albums produced by Spot (producer)
1983 debut albums
The Dicks albums
SST Records albums
Alternative Tentacles albums